Brentwood High School may refer to:

Australia
Brentwood Secondary College (Glen Waverley, Victoria)

United Kingdom
 Brentwood County High School (Brentwood, Essex)
 Brentwood School (Brentwood, Essex)

United States
 Brentwood High School (Missouri)
 Brentwood High School (New York)
 Brentwood High School (Pennsylvania)
 Brentwood High School (Tennessee)
 Brentwood School (Los Angeles)